Thomas Broadbent may refer to:

Thomas Harold Broadbent Maufe (1898–1942), English recipient of the Victoria Cross
Thomas Biggin Broadbent (1793–1817), English preacher
Tom Broadbent (Australian footballer) (born 1936), Australian rules footballer for Fitzroy
Tom Broadbent (English footballer) (born 1992), association football player